Mary Salter may refer to:
 Mary Jo Salter, American poet
 Mary Elizabeth Turner Salter, American soprano and composer